The Women's EuroHockey Indoor Championship II, formerly known as the Women's EuroHockey Indoor Nations Trophy, is an international women's indoor hockey competition organized by the European Hockey Federation. It is the second level of women's European indoor hockey championships.

The tournament is part of the EuroHockey Indoor Championships and is the second level in the women's competition. The two first ranked teams qualify for the next EuroHockey Indoor Championship and are replaced by the two lowest-ranked teams from that tournament. The lowest two teams each year are relegated to the EuroHockey Indoor Championship III and replaced by the highest two teams from that competition.

The tournament has been won by nine different teams: Russia has the most titles with three, the Czech Republic and Ukraine have two titles and Lithuania, France, Belgium, Poland, the Netherlands and Spain have won the tournament once. The most recent edition was held in Sveti Ivan Zelina, Croatia and was won by Russia. The next edition will be held in Ourense, Spain in January 2022.

Results

Summary

* = hosts

Team appearances

See also
Men's EuroHockey Indoor Championship II
Women's EuroHockey Championship II
Women's EuroHockey Indoor Championship

References

External links
European Hockey Federation

 
Women 2
EuroHockey Indoor Championship II
EuroHockey Indoor Championship II